Road Trip Adventure, also known as Road Trip or Choro Q HG 2 (often mislabeled as Road Trip: Arcade Edition), is a racing adventure video game for the PlayStation 2 developed by E-game (but commonly credited to Takara). The game was released in 2002 in Japan by Takara, in North America by Conspiracy Entertainment, and in 2003 in Europe and other PAL regions by System 3 under their Play It label.

The game combines elements of open world racing and adventure games, and is widely considered to be the best of the Choro Q series due to its large seamless world which the player can freely explore. The game takes place in a world of anthropomorphic cars that interact like humans. As part of the PS2 Classics release, Road Trip Adventure was released on the PlayStation Store for the PS3 in Europe on February 15, 2012; however, it was not released on the American PSN.

Story

After starting a new game in Adventure Mode, a cutscene begins inside the office of President Forest, who is burnt out from being president. He has decided to hand over the presidency to the winner of the World Grand Prix, a seven race series for only the most elite and talented racers. The president's secretary leaves, ready to broadcast this news to the world.

Next, the player appears inside the Q’s Factory in Peach Town, a small town named after the surrounding peach farms. Each town's Q's Factory is where the player changes car parts. The worker in the Q's Factory informs the player that he or she may become president, if lucky enough to win the World Grand Prix.

After these starting scenes, gameplay is almost entirely open-ended, loosely centered around the goal of winning the World Grand Prix and becoming president. To qualify for the World Grand Prix, the player must have two teammates and a Class Super A License, earned by finishing top 6 in every race of each license tier: C, B, and A, respectively. To acquire teammates, one can simply talk to other cars; if they can be recruited, they may ask the player to add them as a teammate, provided the player has previously won a race. Each race rewards the performance of the player's teammates, as well as the player’s. As a result, it is imperative for a player to equip his or her teammates with adequate parts for each race.

To measure a player's achievement, there are 100 "stamps" which he or she can earn, one of which is becoming president. Stamps involve activities ranging from mini-games to doing small favors for other cars, and upon earning all 100, the player is eligible for a special surprise. As an example, one of the 100 stamps requires completing the player's picture album. To take a picture, the player can visit any of the 100 Quick-Pic Shops, denoted by black marks on the mini-map; after taking a picture, the owner (always a pink Toyota Vitz) will inform the player of the next shop's location. Another important stamp entails collecting all 100 Choro Q coins hidden in the cities around the world (with the exception of Cloud Hill). One of the residents of My City trades various parts and objects for Choro Q coins, and many of these parts can give the player a distinct advantage in other tasks, including winning the World Grand Prix. Each city contains a bar, whose owner can give hints as to the whereabouts of nearby coins.

Additionally, a major recurring theme is populating "My City," the city which the player founds as the first resident. To build up My City, the player must talk to many different cars throughout the world and find those interested in starting a new life or building new homes or shops. As more and more residents move to My City, those residents' houses and shops appear throughout the city, each building being themed after the architectural style of its resident's hometown. Once complete, My City contains a school, fire department, police station, Q's Factory, Body Shop, Parts Shop, Paint Shop, parks, and residential houses.

Gameplay

Economy 
At the start of the game, the player is asked to specify a name for the currency used for the rest of the game. Money is central to Road Trip Adventure, as it is necessary to purchase most parts. To win money, one can race, advertise for various shops, sell parts to a resident of My City, or even play roulette. Five shops can provide a small above-car billboard to advertise with: the coffee shop in Peach Town (10 currency per km), a noodle restaurant in Fuji City (20 currency per km), a cake shop in Sandpolis (30 currency per km), a wool shop in White Mountain (40 currency per km), and a coconut shop in Papaya Island (50 currency per km). Each shop gives you a certain amount of money per kilometer driven while equipped with its respective advertisement sign. The player can also put one sign on each teammate.

Minigames 
There are around 20 minigames in Road Trip Adventure. Completing them earns money, stamps and parts. These minigames include Soccer, Roulette, and Drag Races.

Locations 
The following is a list of cities in Adventure Mode in the order in which they are typically first encountered. The world in Adventure Mode, with the exception of Cloud Hill, is cyclic, meaning that one can driving through all the cities consecutively and return to the original location of Peach Town.

Soundtrack
In the US and European versions, there are two radio stations to choose from. The Japanese version's radio feature is more extensive, featuring an additional station with voiced DJs.

The first station includes slight remixes of the following songs:
 The Push Kings - The Minute
 The Push Kings - Sunday on the West Side
 The Push Kings - Wild Ones
 The Waking Hours - Jade

The second station consists of instrumental tracks, some of which are uncredited arrangements of songs composed by Michael Walthius. The game's overall music and sound are credited to Fumio Tanabe.

Reception

Road Trip received "favorable" reviews according to the review aggregation website Metacritic. The game was praised for its wide world to explore and great depth, but criticized for its sound.

References

External links
 

2002 video games
PlayStation 2 games
PlayStation Network games
Racing video games
Takara video games
Video games based on Takara Tomy toys
Video games developed in Japan
Works about vacationing
Conspiracy Entertainment games
Multiplayer and single-player video games